The National Association of Workhouse Masters and Matrons was an organisation for the senior staff of workhouses and  workhouse infirmaries  established in 1897.

Around 1915 it was renamed the National Association of Masters and Matrons of Poor Law Institutions.

It eventually became the Association of Health and Residential Care Officers and ceased to exist in 1984.

References

Poor law infirmaries